Bloomington Springs (also Bloomington, Blumington) is an unincorporated community in Putnam County, Tennessee, United States. It has a post office, with ZIP code 38545.  It is concentrated around the intersection of Tennessee State Route 56 and Tennessee State Route 291, north of Baxter and west of Cookeville.

Notes

Unincorporated communities in Putnam County, Tennessee
Unincorporated communities in Tennessee